The 1500 metres distance for women in the 2011–12 ISU Speed Skating World Cup was contested over six races on six occasions, out of a total of seven World Cup occasions for the season, with the first occasion taking place in Chelyabinsk, Russia, on 18–20 November 2011, and the final occasion taking place in Berlin, Germany, on 9–11 March 2012.

Christine Nesbitt of Canada successfully defended her title from the previous season, while Ireen Wüst of the Netherlands came second, and Marrit Leenstra, also of the Netherlands, came third.

Top three

Race medallists

Standings 
Standings as of 11 March 2012 (end of the season).

References 

Women 1500
ISU